Nguyễn Hoài Anh (born 10 March 1993) is a Vietnamese footballer who plays as a goalkeeper for Khánh Hòa and the Vietnam national team.

Club career

Ho Chi Minh City
Hoài Anh was loaned out to V.League 2 side Ho Chi Minh City for the 2016 season.

References

1993 births
Living people
Vietnamese footballers
Association football goalkeepers
V.League 1 players
Than Quang Ninh FC players
People from Quảng Ninh province